Bear Valley (formerly Haydenville, Biddle's Camp, Biddleville, Simpsonville, and Johnsonville) is a census-designated place in Mariposa County, California, United States. Bear Valley has been designated California Historical Landmark #331. The population was 156 at the 2020 census.

History
The place was originally called "Haydenville" in honor of David, Charles, and William Hayden, gold miners. The place later bore the names "Biddle's Camp" and "Biddleville" in honor of William C. Biddle. It later was named "Simpsonville" in honor of Robert Simpson, local merchant. The name "Johnsonville" honored John F. Johnson. The name became Bear Valley in 1858.

The Haydenville post office opened before January 21, 1851, and closed in 1852. The Bear Valley post office operated from 1858 to 1912, from 1914 to 1919, and from 1933 to 1955.

In 1847, John C. Frémont, a veteran of the Bear Flag Revolt, decided to settle down in the San Francisco Bay Area. Desiring a ranch near San Jose, he sent $3,000 to the American consul Thomas O. Larkin. The original Mexican grant was a "floating grant", a grant of land for which the area was precisely given but the actual boundaries were left unspecified (usually due to inadequate surveys of the areas involved). After the beginning of the California Gold Rush in 1848, Fremont moved his grant's borders into the hills. Those hills proved to be lucrative, and his mining operations centered in Bear Valley.

At its peak, Bear Valley had a population of 3,000.  During 1850-60 when Frémont's Pine Tree and Josephine Mines were producing, Frémont built an elegant hotel, Oso House; the structure, like many in the area, burned in the late 19th century. Frémont lived and worked in the city, and his large home was nicknamed the Little White House, coincidentally built two years after he was the first Republican Party candidate for US President; the home burned in 1866.

Geography
Bear Valley is in west-central Mariposa County in the foothills of the Sierra Nevada. California State Route 49 passes through the community, leading southeast  to Mariposa, the county seat, and northwest through the Merced River canyon  to Coulterville.

Demographics

The 2010 United States Census reported that Bear Valley had a population of 125. The population density was 17.3 people per square mile (6.7/km). The racial makeup of Bear Valley was 117 (93.6%) White, 0 (0.0%) African American, 1 (0.8%) Native American, 2 (1.6%) Asian, 0 (0.0%) Pacific Islander, 1 (0.8%) from other races, and 4 (3.2%) from two or more races.  Hispanic or Latino of any race were 8 persons (6.4%).

The Census reported that 125 people (100% of the population) lived in households, 0 (0%) lived in non-institutionalized group quarters, and 0 (0%) were institutionalized.

There were 58 households, out of which 15 (25.9%) had children under the age of 18 living in them; 29 (50.0%) were opposite-sex married couples living together; 3 (5.2%) had a female householder with no husband present, 1 (1.7%) had a male householder with no wife present. There were 4 (6.9%) unmarried opposite-sex partnerships, 0 (0%) same-sex married couples or partnerships. Twenty households (34.5%) were made up of individuals, and 9 (15.5%) had someone living alone who was 65 years of age or older. The average household size was 2.16. There were 33 families (56.9% of all households). The average family size was 2.85.

The population was spread out, with 25 people (20.0%) under the age of 18, 1 person (0.8%) aged 18 to 24, 30 people (24.0%) aged 25 to 44, 38 people (30.4%) aged 45 to 64, and 31 people (24.8%) who were 65 years of age or older.  The median age was 47.6 years. For every 100 females, there were 92.3 males. For every 100 females age 18 and over, there were 96.1 males.

There were 68 housing units at an average density of 9.4 per square mile (3.6/km), of which 44 (75.9%) were owner-occupied, and 14 (24.1%) were occupied by renters. The homeowner vacancy rate was 0%; the rental vacancy rate was 6.7%. Ninety-one people (72.8% of the population) lived in owner-occupied housing units and 34 people (27.2%) lived in rental housing units.

References

Census-designated places in Mariposa County, California
California Historical Landmarks
Census-designated places in California